The 2018 Asia Rugby Championship was the fourth annual rugby union series for the top-level Asia Rugby nations. The Asia Rugby Championship in 2018 formed part of the World Cup qualifying process and, as such, did not include Japan who had already qualified as the 2019 Rugby World Cup host. Hong Kong and South Korea were joined by Malaysia, promoted from Division 1, to compete in the 2018 series. Other Asian nations played in the lower division tournaments.

The format of the tri-nations series is a double round-robin where the three teams play each other twice on a home and away basis. The team finishing on top of the standings at the end of the series is declared the winner. The 2018 series winner Hong Kong advanced to a cross-regional play-off series against Oceania 4, Cook Islands, to earn a berth in the repechage tournament.

Teams
The teams involved, with their world rankings prior to the 2018 tournament in brackets:

Standings

Fixtures
Source: asiarugby.com

Week 1

Week 2

Week 3

Week 4

Week 5

Week 6

References

2018 in Asian rugby union
2018 rugby union tournaments for national teams
2018
International rugby union competitions hosted by Hong Kong
International rugby union competitions hosted by South Korea
International rugby union competitions hosted by Malaysia
rugby union
rugby union
Asia Rugby Championships
Asia Rugby Championships
Asia Rugby Championships